Lawrence Maxwell Krauss (born May 27, 1954) is an American  theoretical physicist and cosmologist who previously taught at Arizona State University, Yale University, and Case Western Reserve University. He founded ASU's Origins Project in 2008 to investigate fundamental questions about the universe and served as the project's director. 

Krauss is an advocate for public understanding of science, public policy based on sound empirical data, scientific skepticism, and science education. An anti-theist, Krauss seeks to reduce the influence of what he regards as superstition and religious dogma in popular culture.

Krauss is the author of several bestselling books, including The Physics of Star Trek (1995) and A Universe from Nothing (2012), and chaired the Bulletin of the Atomic Scientists Board of Sponsors.

Upon investigating allegations about sexual misconduct by Krauss, ASU determined that Krauss had violated university policy and did not renew his Origins Project directorship for a third term in July 2018. Krauss continued as a Professor at ASU until retiring in May 2019. He currently serves as President of The Origins Project Foundation and as host of The Origins Podcast with Lawrence Krauss.

Early life and education
Krauss was born on May 27, 1954, in New York City, but spent his childhood in Toronto. He was raised in a household that was Jewish but not religious. Krauss received undergraduate degrees in mathematics and physics with first-class honours at Carleton University in Ottawa in 1977, and was awarded a Ph.D. in physics at the Massachusetts Institute of Technology in 1982.

Career
After some time in the Harvard Society of Fellows, Krauss became an assistant professor at Yale University in 1985 and associate professor in 1988. He left Yale for Case Western Reserve University in 1993 when he was named the Ambrose Swasey Professor of Physics, professor of astronomy, and chairman of the physics department until 2005. In 2006, Krauss led the initiative for the no-confidence vote against Case Western Reserve University's president Edward M. Hundert and provost John L. Anderson by the College of Arts and Sciences faculty. On March 2, 2006, both no-confidence votes were carried: 131–44 against Hundert and 97–68 against Anderson.

In August 2008, Krauss joined the faculty at Arizona State University as a Foundation Professor in the School of Earth and Space Exploration at the Department of Physics in the College of Liberal Arts and Sciences. He also became the Director of the Origins Project, a university initiative "created to explore humankind's most fundamental questions about our origins". In 2009, he helped inaugurate this initiative at the Origins Symposium, in which eighty scientists participated and three thousand people attended.

Donors to the Origins Project included a foundation called "Enhanced Education", run by the financier Jeffrey Epstein. In 2011, Krauss defended his association with Epstein, saying "As a scientist I always judge things on empirical evidence and he always has women ages 19 to 23 around him, but I've never seen anything else, so as a scientist, my presumption is that whatever the problems were I would believe him over other people."

Krauss appears in the media both at home and abroad to facilitate public outreach in science. He has also written editorials for The New York Times. As a result of his appearance in 2002 before the state school board of Ohio, his opposition to intelligent design has gained national prominence.

Krauss attended and was a speaker at the Beyond Belief symposia in November 2006 and October 2008. He served on the science policy committee for Barack Obama's first (2008) presidential campaign and, also in 2008, was named co-president of the board of sponsors of the Bulletin of the Atomic Scientists. In 2010, he was elected to the board of directors of the Federation of American Scientists, and in June 2011, he joined the professoriate of the New College of the Humanities, a private college in London. In 2013, he accepted a part-time professorship at the Research School of Astronomy and Astrophysics in the physics department of the Australian National University.

Krauss is a critic of string theory, which he discusses in his 2005 book Hiding in the Mirror. In his 2012 book A Universe from Nothing Krauss says about string theory "we still have no idea if this remarkable theoretical edifice actually has anything to do with the real world". Released in March 2011, another book titled Quantum Man: Richard Feynman's Life in Science, while A Universe from Nothingwith an afterword by Richard Dawkinswas released in January 2012, and became a New York Times bestseller within a week. Originally, its foreword was to have been written by Christopher Hitchens, but Hitchens grew too ill to complete it. The paperback version of the book appeared in January 2013 with a new question-and-answer section and a preface integrating the 2012 discovery of the Higgs boson at the Large Hadron Collider. On March 21, 2017, his newest book, The Greatest Story Ever Told—So Far: Why Are We Here? was released in hardcover, paperback, and audio version.

A July 2012 article in Newsweek, written by Krauss, indicates how the Higgs particle is related to our understanding of the Big Bang. He also wrote a longer piece in The New York Times explaining the science behind and significance of the particle.

In January 2019, Krauss became President of the Origins Project Foundation, a non-profit corporation intended to host public panel discussions on science, culture, and social issues. On June 21, 2019, a new video podcast, The Origins Podcast with Lawrence Krauss, launched with Krauss as host. The first episodes included dialogues with Ricky Gervais, Noam Chomsky, and Jenny Boylan.

Scientific work

Krauss mostly works in theoretical physics and has published research on a variety of topics within that field. In 1995 he proposed that the energy-density of the universe was dominated by the energy of empty space.  In 1998 this prediction was confirmed by two observational collaborations and in 2011 the Nobel Prize was awarded for their discovery.  Krauss has formulated a model in which the Universe could have potentially come from "nothing", as outlined in his 2012 book A Universe from Nothing. He explains that certain arrangements of relativistic quantum fields might explain the existence of the Universe as we know it while disclaiming that he "has no idea if the notion [of taking quantum mechanics for granted] can be usefully dispensed with". As his model appears to agree with experimental observations of the Universe (such as its shape and energy density), it is referred to by some as a "plausible hypothesis". His model has been criticized by cosmologist and theologian George Ellis, who said it "is not tested science" but "philosophical speculation".

Initially, Krauss was skeptical of the existence of the Higgs boson. However, after it was detected by CERN, he has been researching the implications of the Higgs field on the nature of dark energy.

Activism

Krauss has argued that public policy debates in the United States should have a greater focus on science. He criticized Republican presidential candidate Ben Carson's statements on science, writing that Carson's remarks "suggest he never learned or chooses to ignore basic, well-tested scientific concepts".

Krauss has described himself as an antitheist and takes part in public debates on religion. Krauss is featured in the 2013 documentary The Unbelievers, in which he and Richard Dawkins travel across the globe speaking publicly about the importance of science and reason as opposed to religion and superstition. He has participated in many debates with religious apologists, including William Lane Craig and John Lennox.

In his book A Universe from Nothing: Why There is Something Rather than Nothing (2012), Krauss discusses the premise that something cannot come from nothing, which has often been used as an argument for the existence of a prime mover. He has since argued in a debate with John Ellis and Don Cupitt that the laws of physics allow for the Universe to be created from nothing. "What would be the characteristics of a universe that was created from nothing, just with the laws of physics and without any supernatural shenanigans? The characteristics of the universe would be precisely those of the ones we live in." In an interview with The Atlantic, however, he states that he has never claimed that "questions about origins are over". According to Krauss, "I don't ever claim to resolve that infinite regress of why-why-why-why-why; as far as I'm concerned it's turtles all the way down".

With the publication of his newest book, The Physics of Climate Change (2021), Krauss is urging the use of science, and not politics, ideology, or emotion, to steer the public debate on how to address climate change.

Honors
In an interview with Krauss in the Scientific American, science writer Claudia Dreifus called Krauss "one of the few top physicists who is also known as a public intellectual." Krauss is one of very few to have received awards from all three major American physics societies: the American Physical Society, the American Association of Physics Teachers, and the American Institute of Physics. In 2012, he was awarded the National Science Board's Public Service Medal for his contributions to public education in science and engineering in the United States.

Relationship with Jeffrey Epstein
Krauss helped to organize a 2006 conference on gravity, funded by Jeffrey Epstein. The conference was held on St. Thomas in the U.S. Virgin Islands.

Krauss defended Epstein after his 2008 guilty plea of procuring for prostitution a girl below age 18. In 2011, Krauss told an interviewer, "As a scientist I always judge things on empirical evidence and he always has women ages 19 to 23 around him, but I've never seen anything else, so as a scientist, my presumption is that whatever the problems were I would believe him over other people...I don't feel tarnished in any way by my relationship with Jeffrey; I feel raised by it."

Harvard Professor Steven Pinker said that Krauss was one of several colleagues who invited him to "salons and coffee klatsches" that included Epstein.

Allegations of sexual misconduct
In a February 2018 article describing allegations that "range from offensive comments to groping and non-consensual sexual advances", BuzzFeed reported a variety of sexual misconduct claims against Krauss, including two complaints from his years at Case Western Reserve University. Krauss responded that the article was "slanderous" and "factually incorrect". In a public statement, he apologized to anyone he made feel intimidated or uncomfortable, but stated that the BuzzFeed article "ignored counter-evidence, distorted the facts and made absurd claims about [him]."

ASU stated that they had not received complaints from faculty, staff, or students before the BuzzFeed article but subsequently began an internal investigation regarding an accusation that Krauss grabbed a woman's breast while at a convention in Australia. Investigators interviewed two eyewitnesses, and two other witnesses who immediately spoke with the unnamed woman. The witnesses described the woman as troubled and shocked. The woman told investigators that "she did not feel victimized, felt it was a clumsy interpersonal interaction and thought she had handled it in the moment." ASU found that the preponderance of evidence suggested that Krauss had violated the university's policy against sexual harassment by grabbing a woman's breast without her permission. As a result, Krauss was not renewed as Director of the Origins Project and the University moved its staff to a project run by planetary scientist Lindy Elkins-Tanton, formally ending the Origins project.

In response to the University determination, Krauss produced a 51-page appeal document responding to the allegations, including a counter-claim that a photo claimed to be of Krauss grabbing a woman's breast was actually showing his hand moving away from the woman.

Several organizations also canceled scheduled talks by Krauss. Krauss resigned from the position of chair of the Bulletin of the Atomic Scientists Board of Sponsors when informed that its other members felt his presence was distracting "from the ability of the Bulletin to effectively carry out [its] work".

Krauss retired from ASU at the end of the 2018–2019 academic year.

Bibliography

Krauss has authored or co-authored more than three hundred scientific studies and review articles on cosmology and theoretical physics.

Books
 The Fifth Essence (1989), Basic Books, 
 Fear of Physics: A Guide for the Perplexed (1994), Basic Books, 
 The Physics of Star Trek (1996), Basic Books, 
 Beyond Star Trek: Physics from Alien Invasions to the End of Time (1998), Harper Collins, 
 Quintessence: The Search for Missing Mass in the Universe (2000), Basic Books, 
 Atom: An Odyssey from the Big Bang to Life on Earth...and Beyond (2001), Black Bay, 
 Hiding in the Mirror: The Mysterious Allure of Extra Dimensions, from Plato to String Theory and Beyond (2005), Viking, 
 Quantum Man: Richard Feynman's Life in Science (2011), Norton and Co. 
 A Universe from Nothing: Why There Is Something Rather Than Nothing (2012), Atria Books,  
 The Greatest Story Ever Told—So Far: Why Are We Here? (2017), Atria Books, 
 The Physics of Climate Change (2021), Post Hill Press, 
 The Known Unknowns (2023), Head of Zeus/Apollo, / The Edge of Knowledge (2023), Post Hill Press, 

Contributor
 100 Things to Do Before You Die (plus a few to do afterwards). 2004. Profile Books.
 The Religion and Science Debate: Why Does It Continue? 2009. Yale Press.

Articles
 The Energy of Empty Space that isn't Zero. 2006. Edge.org 
 A dark future for cosmology. 2007. Physics World.
 The End of Cosmology. 2008. Scientific American.
 The return of a static universe and the end of cosmology. 2008. International Journal of Modern Physics.
 Late time behavior of false vacuum decay: Possible implications for cosmology and metastable inflating states. 2008. Physical Review Letters.
 The Cosmological Constant is Back, with M. S. Turner, Gen.Rel.Grav.27:1137–1144, 1995
 

 Media 

Documentary films
 The Unbelievers (2013)
 The Principle (2014)
  (2016)
 Lo and Behold, Reveries of the Connected World (2016)
 The Farthest (2017)

Television
 How the Universe Works (2010–2018)

Films
 London Fields (2015) (cameo)
 Salt and Fire (2016)
 Intersect (2020) 

 Awards 

 Gravity Research Foundation First Prize Award in the 1984 Essay Competition
 Presidential Investigator Award (1986)
 American Association for the Advancement of Science's Award for the Public Understanding of Science and Technology (2000)
 Julius Edgar Lilienfeld Prize (2001)
 Andrew Gemant Award (2001)
 American Institute of Physics Science Writing Award (2002)
 Oersted Medal (2003)
 American Physical Society Joseph A. Burton Forum Award (2005)
 Center for Inquiry World Congress Science in the Public Interest Award (2009)
 Helen Sawyer Hogg Prize of the Royal Astronomical Society of Canada and the Astronomical Society of Canada (2009)
 Physics World Book of the Year 2011 for Quantum Man
 National Science Board 2012 Public Service Award and Medal (2012)
 Premio Roma "Urbs Universalis", Rome (2013)
 Elected as Laureate of the International Academy of Humanism (2013)
 AFO (Academia Film Olomouc) Award for Outstanding Personal Contribution to the Popularization of Science, 49th Annual AFO Festival April 19, 2014. Olomouc, Czech Republic 
 Gravity Research Foundation First Prize Award in the 2014 Essay Competition
 Humanist of the Year, 2015, American Humanist Association
 Richard Dawkins Award 2016, Atheist Alliance of America
 Emperor Has No Clothes Award 2016, Freedom from Religion Foundation
 Albert Nelson Marquis Lifetime Achievement Award 2019.Marquis Who's Who
 Elected to Advisory Council, Atheist Alliance International, 2020

 References 

 External links 

  Lawrence Krauss at Origins Project Foundation 
 Articles on the Bulletin of the Atomic Scientists Articles on The New Yorker''
 Lawrence Krauss interviewed by Bill Ludlow, February 26, 2019
 
 
 

1954 births
Living people
American astronomers
21st-century American physicists
American mathematicians
American science writers
American skeptics
Arizona State University faculty
Case Western Reserve University faculty
Harvard Fellows
Yale University faculty
Carleton University alumni
Scientists from New York City
Scientists from Toronto
Writers from New York City
Writers from Toronto
Canadian atheists
Canadian mathematicians
Canadian physicists
American atheism activists
Canadian science writers
Canadian skeptics
Theoretical physicists
American humanists
Jewish American scientists
Jewish physicists
Jewish American atheists
Jewish humanists
Jewish skeptics
20th-century atheists
21st-century atheists
Articles containing video clips
MIT Department of Physics alumni
MIT Center for Theoretical Physics alumni
Science_communicators